Chamusca is a former civil parish in the municipality of Chamusca, Portugal. In 2013, the parish merged into the new parish Chamusca e Pinheiro Grande. It covers an area of 35.3 km² and had a population of 3,659 as of 2001.

References

Former parishes of Chamusca